Tisiyeh (also Romanized as Tīsīyeh; also known as Tasīyeh, Teseyeh, and Tesīh) is a village in Kateh Sar-e Khomam Rural District, Khomam District, Rasht County, Gilan Province, Iran. At the 2006 census, its population was 1,721, in 521 families.

References 

Populated places in Rasht County